Jane Jeong Trenka is a Korean American activist and an award-winning writer. She is the president of the organization TRACK (Truth and Reconciliation for the Adoption Community of Korea).

Early life
Trenka was born in Seoul, Korea in 1972. When she was six months old, Trenka and her sister were adopted into a white family in rural northern Minnesota. Her Korean mother found her daughters in 1972, shortly after the girls were sent to the U.S. and before they were legally adopted. Trenka reunited with her birth mother in Korea in 1995 when she was 23. In 2004, she returned to live in Korea. While applying for a visa in 2006, Trenka discovered that the Korean adoption agency that had overseen her adoption had lied, both about her background and about the people who were going to adopt her. Trenka became an activist for standard and transparent adoption practices to protect the human rights of adult adoptees, children, and families. She officially repatriated to South Korea in 2008.

Career and education 
Trenka received a degree in music performance from Augsburg University in Minneapolis, Minnesota and became a piano teacher in Minnesota before her return to Korea.

While studying at Augsburg University, Trenka was consistently stalked, and she has spoken publicly about her experience in order to raise awareness to the issue, including discussing the incident in her book The Language of Blood. Her experiences were adapted for an episode of the Investigation Discovery series Obsession: Dark Desires.

In 2013, Trenka attended Seoul National University to pursue a degree in public administration.

She has written two memoirs on her experiences with international, transracial adoption: The Language of Blood and Fugitive Visions: An Adoptee's Return to Korea.

Works
The Language of Blood, Minnesota Historical Society Press, 2003; Graywolf Press, 2005
피의 언어, Y-Gelli Press 2005; Domabaem 2012
 Outsiders Within: Writing on Transracial Adoption, South End Press, 2006
 인종간 입양의 사회학, KoRoot Press, 2012 
 Fugitive Visions: An Adoptee's Return to Korea, Graywolf Press, 2009
 덧없는 환영들, Changbi Publishers, 2012

Awards
 Minnesota Book Award for Autobiography/Memoir for The Language of Blood
 Minnesota Book Award for New Voice for The Language of Blood
 Barnes & Noble Discover Great New Writers Selection for The Language of Blood

See also 

List of Asian American writers

References

External links
 Interview with Jane Jeong Trenka on adoptive parents
 TRACK: Truth and Reconciliation for the Adoption Community of Korea
 An Adoptee Returns to Korea, and Changes Follow (New York Times, June 28, 2013)

1972 births
Living people
American writers of Korean descent
21st-century American women writers
Augsburg University alumni
American women novelists
American adoptees
South Korean adoptees